Eriauchenus rafohy is a species of spider in the family Archaeidae. It is endemic to Madagascar. The genus name has also been incorrectly spelt "Eriauchenius".

References 

Archaeidae
Spiders described in 2018